Dorinel Popa  (born 29 November 1988) is a Romanian footballer who plays as a midfielder.

References

External links
 Official FCSB profile 
 

1988 births
Sportspeople from Focșani
Living people
Romanian footballers
Association football midfielders
Liga I players
Liga II players
CSM Focșani players
FC Gloria Buzău players
CS Brănești players
FC Steaua București players
FC Universitatea Cluj players
LPS HD Clinceni players
CS Balotești players
CS Șoimii Pâncota players